Sertan is a Turkish given name for males and may refer to:

Given name
 Sertan Baykara, German journalist
 Sertan Eser, Turkish footballer
 Sertan Esentürk, Social Media Expert

See also
 Primidone 

Turkish masculine given names